William Marthé (born 1894, date of death unknown) was a Swiss long-distance runner. He competed in the men's 5000 metres at the 1924 Summer Olympics.

References

External links
 

1894 births
Year of death missing
Athletes (track and field) at the 1924 Summer Olympics
Swiss male long-distance runners
Olympic athletes of Switzerland
Place of birth missing